Mentzelia laevicaulis is a showy wildflower native to western North America. Its common names include giant blazingstar and smoothstem blazingstar.

This is a widespread plant which can be found in sandy, rocky, and disturbed areas, such as roadsides.

Description

It grows a weedy-looking, branched stem which may reach a yard in height. The whitish-green stem and its lateral branches bear the occasional triangular sawtoothed leaf. The plant bears capsule fruits containing winged seeds.

At the tip of each branch blooms a spectacular yellow flower. The star-shaped flower has five narrow, pointed petals with shiny yellow surfaces, each up to 3 inches long. Between the petals are long, thin yellow sepals. The center of the open-faced flower is filled with a great many whiskery yellow stamens. Beneath the petals are long, curling bracts.

References

External links

Jepson Manual Treatment — Mentzelia laevicaulis
Ventanawild.org: natural history
Mentzelia laevicaulis — U.C. Photo gallery

laevicaulis
Flora of British Columbia
Flora of California
Flora of Colorado
Flora of Idaho
Flora of Montana
Flora of Nevada
Flora of Oregon
Flora of Utah
Flora of Washington (state)
Flora of Wyoming
Flora of the California desert regions
Flora of the Great Basin
Flora of the Sierra Nevada (United States)
Taxa named by Asa Gray
Taxa named by John Torrey
Flora without expected TNC conservation status